Elections were held in the state of Western Australia on 18 March 1939 to elect all 50 members to the Legislative Assembly. The Labor Party, led by Premier John Willcock, won a third term in office against the Country and Nationalist parties, led by Opposition Leader Charles Latham and Robert Ross McDonald respectively.

Results

The election was notable for the lack of change to the status quo. Only one member—former Speaker Michael Troy, who had been in the Assembly continuously since 1904—opted to retire, being replaced in his seat of Mount Magnet by fellow Labor member Lucien Triat. Labor's Bill Hegney gained the seat of Pilbara from two-term Nationalist MLA Frank Welsh, whilst the Nationalist member since 1914 for North Perth, James MacCallum Smith, was defeated by independent Nationalist Arthur Abbott (who joined the party some years later).

Elsewhere, the only change was the exit of one Independent member—Clarence Doust in Nelson, who was defeated by his Nationalist predecessor John Henry Smith after one term—and the entry of another from Irwin-Moore, Claude Barker, replacing Country member Percy Ferguson.

|}

 265,987 electors were enrolled to vote at the election, but 10 of the 50 seats were uncontested—4 Labor seats representing 9,414 enrolled voters, 2 Nationalist seats representing 11,396 voters and 4 Country seats representing 16,614 voters.

See also
 Members of the Western Australian Legislative Assembly, 1936–1939
 Members of the Western Australian Legislative Assembly, 1939–1943

References

Elections in Western Australia
1939 elections in Australia
1930s in Western Australia
March 1939 events